The 2019–20 Aberdeen F.C. season was Aberdeen's 106th season in the top flight of Scottish football and the seventh in the Scottish Premiership. Aberdeen also competed in the League Cup, the Scottish Cup, and in qualifying for the 2019–20 UEFA Europa League.

On 13 March 2020, the Scottish football season was suspended with immediate effect due to the COVID-19 pandemic. On 18 May 2020, the SPFL declared the end of the season determining on an average points per game with the Dons finishing in fourth place.

Summary

June
The club at the end of May confirmed youngsters David Craddock, Morgan Brown and Ryan Harrington were released along with Greg Halford, whilst Greg Stewart, Dominic Ball, James Wilson and Max Lowe returned to their parent clubs. Graeme Shinnie and Mark Reynolds signed pre-contracts with Derby County and Dundee United respectively.

On 4 June, Wales International Ryan Hedges signed a three-year deal on a pre-contract joining from Barnsley officially on 1 July, and Ash Taylor signed a two-year deal as he returns to Pittodrie after two years at Northampton Town. The following day, Curtis Main signed a two-year deal joining from Motherwell. On 13 June, Sam Roscoe joined Ayr United. On 17 June, Luc Bollan joined the development squad from Dundee United.

On 18 June, the Europa League First Qualifying Round draw was made and the Dons were drawn to play against Finnish side RoPS. The following day, Craig Bryson signed a two-year deal on a pre-contract and will join on 30 June from Derby County. Also, Michael Ruth joined from Queens Park and with the Dons paying Compensation, he joined up with the development squad. On 21 June, the Premiership fixtures were released with the Dons starting at home to Hearts.

On 22 June, Jon Gallagher joined the club on an initial six-month loan from MLS side Atlanta United. On 24 June, after contacting him in January, Gary Mackay-Steven signed for New York City. On 25 June, Greg Leigh signed a season-long loan from Dutch side NAC Breda with the option of a future deal. Young goalkeeper Archie Mair joined Norwich City with the Dons receiving compensation for the player, and the club signed up Sam Jackson from Dundee who joined the development squad on a one-year deal.

July

On 3 July, after spending last season on loan, James Wilson signed a two-year deal. He later that day played in a 2–0 friendly win against Peterhead with Sam Cosgrove and Shay Logan scoring the goals. On 5 July, youngster David Dangana joined Stranraer on a season-long loan. On 8 July, after signing a new one-year deal in May, Frank Ross joined Ayr United on loan until January.

Before the first European tie with RoPS Rovaniemi, goalkeeper Joe Lewis was named as the new club captain after the departure of Graeme Shinnie to Derby County. On the day of the match, manager Derek McInnes and assistant head coach Tony Docherty signed a new two-year deal to 2022. The Dons won the first leg 2–1 and despite dominating the match, they conceded a stoppage-time goal, keeping the tie in the balance.

On 14 July, Funso Ojo signed a three-year deal joining from Scunthorpe United for a fee believed to be £125,000. He was originally set to join Hibernian, but manager McInnes convinced him to join Aberdeen. The Dons then played RoPS Rovaniemi in Finland, and in a very nervy match, they won 2–1 to set up a tie with Georgia side Chikhura Sachkhere. Subsequently, the opening match of the season with Hearts was rearranged to 4 August.

August

After drawing 1–1 in the first leg, the Dons thrashed Chikhura Sachkhere 5–0 at Pittodrie to set up a tie with Rijeka who they met in 2015 and won 5–2 on aggregate. Due to the Dons qualifying for the next round, the League match with St Mirren and the League Cup match with Dundee were pushed back 24 hours to the Sundays. Before the away match with Rijeka, Zak Vyner joined the club on an initial season-long loan from Bristol City. The Dons also resisted a transfer request from defender Scott McKenna and bids for him from Queens Park Rangers and Nottingham Forest and Bristol City. Aberdeen lost the away leg to Rijeka 2–0, with reports Dons fans were treated badly with lead to an investigation by UEFA.

On 14 August, goalkeeper Danny Rogers moved to Greenock Morton on a season-long loan deal. Aberdeen were knocked out of the Europa League with a 2–0 defeat to Rijeka, ending 4–0 on aggregate. It was the sixth year in a row they had failed to get past the third qualifying round. Aberdeen needed extra time to beat Dundee in the League Cup to set up a quarter-final tie away to Hearts.

On 29 August 2019, defender Scott McKenna was ruled out for a month with a hamstring injury sustained in the 0–0 draw against Kilmarnock. Also, Stevie May left the Dons and signed for St Johnstone for a second time. Young defender Miko Virtanen joined Arbroath on a season-long loan.

September

For the September Internationals, Ryan Hedges was called up for Wales, Michael Devlin for Scotland, with also Lewis Ferguson for Scotland Under 21s respectively. Niall McGinn played for Northern Ireland in a 2–0 defeat to Germany. Connor McLennan came off the bench and scored two goals for Scotland Under 21s against Croatia Under 21s. On 12 September, winger Scott Wright injured his knee in training and "may miss the rest of the season".

After the 1–1 home draw with St Johnstone, Craig Bryson and Funso Ojo were added to the injury list, adding to the clubs "injury crisis". Despite this, the Dons won their next match at Livingston. But a few days later, the Dons were knocked out of the League Cup, missing all 3 penalties against Hearts in the Quarter finals. The Dons ended the month with a "humiliating" 5–0 defeat to Rangers at Ibrox.

October

For the October Internationals, Michael Devlin was again called up for Scotland whilst also Niall McGinn for Northern Ireland. Aberdeen drew their next game 1–1 at home to Hibernian but had both Curtis Main and Lewis Ferguson sent off for straight red card offences. Devlin played in both games for Scotland against Russia and San Marino. McGinn came on against Czech Republic with his appearance now ranking him in the Top 20 for Northern Ireland. Lewis Ferguson and Connor McLennan both played for Scotland Under 21s against Lithuania. Dean Campbell and Ethan Ross both played for Scotland Under 19s in a 1–0 win against Germany.

The Dons returned to action with a 3–0 win against Motherwell at Fir Park despite criticism from fans for starting 6 defenders. They then suffered a 4–0 home defeat to Celtic with all 4 goals coming in the first half which left McInnes "embarrassed" by the manner of the defeat. To end the month, they bounced back with a 1–0 win away to Hamilton.

On 31 October, Sir Alex Ferguson opened Aberdeen's new training facilities and football academy Cormack Park, saying it was "up there with the best" he has seen. It cost the club £12 million which includes a training pavilion, groundsman's accommodation, three training pitches, two floodlit 3G surfaces and two grass parks, as well as outdoor and indoor space for community-based sporting and recreational activities. McInnes also said Aberdeen finally have a training facility 'to be proud of'.

November

The Dons began November with a comfortable 3–0 home win against a makeshift Kilmarnock side. Aberdeen then moved up to third in the table with a 3–1 win at Ross County. During the International break, chairman Stewart Milne announced he would be stepping down, to be replaced by Dave Cormack. The club also announced a "strategic partnership" with Major League Soccer side Atlanta United FC.

Andrew Considine joined the 500-club at Aberdeen after captaining the side in a feisty 1–1 draw at St Johnstone, where the home side ended the match with nine men. Shortly after the match, Aberdeen were drawn against Dumbarton in the Scottish Cup. They ended the month with a 2–1 win against St Mirren with Joe Lewis saving a late penalty.

December

Aberdeen came from 2 goals down in their next match to earn a 2–2 home draw against Rangers. They then slumped to a 3–0 defeat to Hibernian at Easter Road with McInnes saying they had "gifted" them the goals. On 13 December, midfielder Dean Campbell signed an extended contract until 2023. The following day, a Cosgrove goal was enough to beat Hamilton Accies. On 16 December, Dave Cormack officially took over as chairman from Stewart Milne.

Cosgrove scored his twentieth goal of the season and was harshly sent off in their next match at Celtic Park with the Dons losing 2–1. Manager McInnes claimed Celtic defender Kristoffer Ajer "laughed and winked" at Cosgrove as he was sent off, saying they would "100% appeal the decision". They were dealt with "a real blow" after the match as Greg Leigh and Craig Bryson were officially ruled out for two months with separate injuries. They also lost the appeal for Cosgrove's red card and he was suspended for two matches.

Aberdeen ended the year with a 2–1 home win against Livingston, which followed with a hard-fought 1–1 away draw at Tynecastle against bottom of the table, ten-man Hearts. Defender Zak Vyner injured his shoulder and was later recalled from his loan spell by his parent club.

January

On 3 January, Under 18s captain Ethan Ross joined Dunfermline Athletic on loan until the end of the season. On 7 January, Dylan McGeouch signed from English club Sunderland on a permanent deal until 2022. On 9 January, Jon Gallagher extended his loan deal until the end of the season. During their training camp in Dubai, the Dons lost a friendly to Jordanian side Al-Wehdat.

On 18 January, the Dons scraped past Dumbarton with a late Cosgrove penalty to make the fifth round of the Scottish Cup. On 21 January, Mark Gallagher joined from Ross County for a nominal fee. He joined with the development squad. After initially signing a pre-contract on 15 January, Matty Kennedy joined permanently on 24 January from St Johnstone on a fee believed to be £70,000. Aberdeen were then booed off away to St Mirren in a 0–0 draw with fans voicing their anger towards the manager.

On transfer deadline day, defender Zak Vyner returned to his parent club Bristol City six months early after being ruled out with a shoulder injury and forward James Wilson was allowed to leave on a free to Salford City. Aberdeen signed Venezuelan international Ronald Hernández on a four-and-a-half year deal from Norwegian club Stabæk. He became the club's first ever Venezuelan player when he made his debut. Irish midfielder Stephen Gleeson had his contract cancelled after struggling with knee injuries.

February

The Dons began February by putting in a superb defensive display against Rangers at Ibrox ending an eight-game home winning streak for them with a 0–0 draw. However, the goalless run continued with a home defeat to St Johnstone and another 0–0 draw in the Scottish Cup against Kilmarnock, making it their longest run without a goal since 1973. The run ended in the next match at Hamilton Accies with a 3–1 win and all goals coming from open play. Even with a "battling" performance in the following match, they lost at home to Celtic, their eighth consecutive home defeat to the Champions.

On 19 February, the team showed "sheer guts and tenacity" in their Scottish Cup fifth round replay against Kilmarnock after coming from behind twice to win in extra time. The win set them up with a tie away to St Mirren in the quarter finals with a Saturday evening kick off of 7:20pm. They continued their 2020 win-less league home run against Ross County, partly due to Dean Campbell being sent off after half-an-hour due to two bookable offences when leading the match 1–0. They ended the month by defeating St Mirren in the Scottish Cup with goals from Lewis Ferguson and a late penalty from Sam Cosgrove to face Celtic in the Semi-finals on 12 April. Unfortunately however, defender Scott McKenna was likely to be ruled out until the end of the season with a torn hamstring.

March

On 4 March, they came back from two goals down to earn a draw at Kilmarnock to preserve the eight-year unbeaten record there but slipped further behind Motherwell in the table. The Dons then ended their win-less home run by beating Hibernian with the away side finishing with ten men.

Due to the COVID-19 pandemic, all games were suspended until further notice. with all club activities shut down until at least 22 March. This led to manager McInnes telling the players to "stay in their own houses" and "to avoid gyms, cinemas, concerts and restaurants". Chairman Dave Cormack released a statement stating the club would lose "£5million in outgoings with no expected income until perhaps July."

April

Chairman Dave Cormack's investment group pledged £2Million and confirmed players and staff were deferred between 10% and 30% in wages for four months. McInnes said it would be "common sense" to crown Celtic champions if the season could not be completed due to the virus. On 9 April, the Scottish football season was further suspended until at least 10 June.

May
On 6 May, Under 18s captain Connor Barron signed a new two-year contract. On 18 May, following on from the season being brought to an end by the SPFL, chairman Dave Cormack said the club faced the "daunting prospect" of a further £1Million in losses.

June 2020
On 11 June, Lewis Ferguson was named as the SFWA Young Player of the Year by the Football Writers' Association. On 13 June, Andrew Considine was named club Player of the Year for a third time and he also won the Players' Player of the Year. Lewis Ferguson won the Goal of the Season award for his strike against St Mirren, Dean Campbell won Young Player of the Year and Michael Ruth won Development Player of the Year.

September 2020
The Semi-final Scottish Cup tie with Celtic was rearranged for 1 November, with the match live on Premier Sports. The Dons were beaten 2–0.

Results & fixtures

Pre-season

Scottish Premiership

UEFA Europa League 

Aberdeen qualified for the First qualifying round after finishing in fourth place in the 2018–19 Scottish Premiership.

Qualifying phase

Scottish Cup

Scottish League Cup

Scottish Challenge Cup

Squad statistics

Appearances 

|-
|colspan="17"|Players who left the club during the season
|-

|-
|colspan="17"|Players signed during the 2020–21 season
|-

|}

Goalscorers

Disciplinary record

Team statistics

League table

Results by round

Transfers

Players in

Players out

Loans in

Loans out

See also 
 List of Aberdeen F.C. seasons

Footnotes

References 

2019-20
Scottish football clubs 2019–20 season
2019–20 UEFA Europa League participants seasons